Denis Kudla was the defending champion, but he did not participate this year. Somdev Devvarman won the title by defeating Daniel Nguyen in the final by a score of 7–5, 4–6, 7–6(7–5). The final match lasted for 3 hours and 31 minutes.

Seeds

Draw

Finals

Top half

Bottom half

External links
 Main draw
 Qualifying draw

Nielsen Pro Tennis Championship - Singles
2015 Singles